The Vietnam Academy of Science and Technology is the largest and most prominent research institute in Vietnam. It was founded on 20 May 1975 as the Vietnam Academy of Science, and renamed the Vietnam Academy of Science and Technology (VAST) in 2008. Its infrastructure spans Hanoi, Ho Chi Minh City, Hải Phòng, Nha Trang, Đà Lạt, and Huế.

In March 2010, the Vietnam Academy of Science and Technology launched a peer reviewed open access journal, Advances in Natural Sciences: Nanoscience and Nanotechnology (ANSN). The journal is jointly published with IOP Publishing.

The Vietnam National Satellite Center, renamed the Vietnam National Space Center (VNSC) in July 2017, was founded as a VAST research center on 16 September 2011 to manage and implement space and satellite projects for the government of Vietnam.

Notes

External links
 Vietnam Academy of Science and Technology
 Advances in Natural Sciences: Nanoscience and Nanotechnology

Educational institutions established in 1975
Science and technology in Vietnam
Scientific organizations based in Vietnam
Technical universities and colleges in Vietnam
1975 establishments in Vietnam